Quigley (released in the United Kingdom as Daddy Dog Day) is a 2003 American Christian comedy film written, directed and co-produced by William Byron Hillman. It stars Gary Busey, Curtis Armstrong, and Oz Perkins, and was released direct-to-video.

Premise
Archie Channing (Gary Busey), the jaded billionaire CEO of a technology corporation, dies in a car accident. To atone for his sins, God has Archie return to Earth in the form of a white Pomeranian named Quigley.

Cast
 Gary Busey as Archie Channing
 Oz Perkins as Guardian Angel Sweeney
 Curtis Armstrong as Dexter Pearlsley
 Caryn Greenhut as Sarah
 Christopher Atkins as Woodward Channing
 Jessica Ferrarone as Joanne Channing
 Jillian Clare as Megan Channing
 Galvin Chapman as Brian Channing (as Galvin T. Chapman)
 Bill Fagerbakke as Security Guard Londo
 Dorien Wilson as Security Guard Pressle
 P. J. Ochlan as Frank the Janitor
 Kieran Mulroney as Dog Catcher Wally Sprigs

Production
The film was shot primarily in Los Angeles, with many scenes taking filmed at the Tillman Water Reclamation Plant and the Japanese Garden in Van Nuys. In an interview with A.V. Club in 2012, Curtis Armstrong recalled an incident where Gary Busey disliked the set of heaven since it did not look like the heaven that he saw when he had a near-death experience. Busey also fought with another actor about what heaven really looked like.

Critical reception
JoBlo.com wrote a positive review for the film commenting that it was "awfully good" and that while it qualified as a bad movie, this made it enjoyable. Rob Gonsalves of eFilmCritic.com panned it, writing "Absolutely none of this is interesting or entertaining, not even on the level of 'I am actually watching a pomeranian who's supposed to be Gary Busey."

The Dove Foundation's review was mostly positive, writing that the "story tempo is somewhat inconsistent, and some scenery and characters are less than believable" but that it was also "loaded with slapstick and silly characters chasing and being chased, mixed with prat falls and double takes."

Awards
Young Artist Award for Best Performance in a Feature Film - Young Actress Age Ten or Younger (2004, nominated - Jillian Clare)

See also
 The Shaggy Dog (1959 film), starring Fred MacMurray and Tommy Kirk
 Nine Lives (2016 film), starring Kevin Spacey and Jennifer Garner

References

External links 
 

2003 films
Films about dogs
American comedy films
2000s English-language films
2000s American films